Myosotis sparsiflora is a species of flowering plant belonging to the family Boraginaceae.

Its native range is Central and Eastern Europe to Southwestern Siberia and Iran.

References

sparsiflora